This article contains the list of candidates associated with the 2004 Russian presidential election.

Registered candidates
Candidates are listed in the order they appear on the ballot paper (alphabetical order in Russian).

Withdrawn candidates

Rejected nominations
Anzori Iosifovich Aksentiev-Kikalishvilli — Chairman of the All-Russian Party of People.
Viktor Gerashchenko (campaign) — Deputy of the State Duma, former Chairman of the State Bank of the USSR and Central Bank of Russia.
Igor Alexandrovich Smykov
German Sterligov (campaign) — former owner of the exchange "Alisa"

Declared candidates who withdrew without registering
Vladimir Bryntsalov (campaign) — Deputy of the State Duma, 1996 presidential candidate.
Vladimir Zhirinovsky

Possible candidates who did not run
The following individuals were included in some polls, were referred to in the media as possible candidates or had publicly expressed interest long before the elections but never announced that they would run.

Dmitry Ayatskov
Alexander Barkashov
Boris Berezovsky
Viktor Chernomyrdin
Anatoly Chubais
Sergey Dorenko
Umar Dzhabrailov
Boris Fyodorov
Yegor Gaidar
Stanislav Govorukhin
German Gref
Boris Gryzlov
Vladimir Gusinsky
Igor Ivanov
Sergey Ivanov
Mikhail Kasyanov
Sergey Kiriyenko
Alexei Kudrin
Mikhail Lapshin
Alexander Lebed (died 28 April 2002)
Alexander Lukashenko
Yury Luzhkov
Valentina Matviyenko
Boris Nemtsov
Ella Pamfilova
Alexey Podberezkin
Nikolay Patrushev
Yevgeny Primakov
Dmitry Rogozin
Vladimir Rushailo
Vladimir Ryzhkov
Savostyanov
Gennady Seleznev
Vladimir Shamanov
Lyubov Sliska
Yegor Stroyev
Sergey Shoygu
Yury Skuratov
Sergei Stepashin
Konstantin Titov
Aman Tuleyev
Alexander Voloshin
Gennady Zyuganov
Grigory Yavlinsky
Boris Yeltsin

References

 
2004